Lordstown is a city in Ohio, US.

Lordstown may also refer to:
 Lordstown Assembly or Lordstown, an auto assembly plant in Lordstown, Ohio
 Lordstown Cluster, a rail division centered around Lordstown, Ohio
 Lordstown High School, a high school in Lordstown, Ohio
 Lordstown Motors, an electric vehicle manufacturer division of Workhorse Group

See also

 Lordville (disambiguation)
Lordsburg (disambiguation)